Video Library was a publicly traded video rental shop based in San Diego, California. It had 43 corporate stores from 1979 through 1989 before they were acquired and converted into Blockbuster Video in 1989.

History
Video Library made its initial public stock offering in mid-1985.

Video Library was owned by Founder and President and Chief Executive Barry L. Rosenblatt, Chairman Roy Keith Black, and shareholder Pauline Sussman. As part of the acquisition deal, the three received Blockbuster stock valued at $66.4 million. At the time of the acquisition, Blockbuster Video operated 58 company-owned and franchised Blockbuster Video Superstores.

Video Library reported $11.9 million in revenue for the third quarter of Sept. 1987.

External links
  at Blockbuster History
 "Blockbuster to Buy Video Library for $6.4 Million" 1988-02-17. Retrieved 2017-07-28.
 "Video Power Plays on Availability." 1986-01-27 San Diego Business Journal. Retrieved 2010-02-07.
 "Video Library Goes Public." 1987-11-17. Los Angeles Times. Retrieved 2010-02-07.

Video rental services
Blockbuster LLC